Thirteenth Assembly of Tamil Nadu was instituted after the victory of DMK and allies, in the 2006 state assembly election. M. Karunanidhi became the 14th Chief Minister of Tamil Nadu due to the election.

Overview 
Source: Tamil Nadu Legislative Assembly website

Council of Ministers 
Source: Tamil Nadu Legislative Assembly website

See also
Government of Tamil Nadu
Legislature of Tamil Nadu

References

Tamil Nadu Legislative Assembly